The Banna people, (also referred to as Banya) are an Omotic ethnic group in Ethiopia inhabiting the Lower Omo Valley, primarily between the Weyto and Omo rivers. They live in an area between the towns of Gazer and Dimeka with the traditional area of the Banna being divided into two ritual regions, Ailama (which is around Gazer) and Anno (spanning from Benata to Dimeka). According to the 2007 census, they number at around 47,000 individuals. They engage primarily in agriculture and supplement this by pastoralism, hunting, and gathering. They are mainly Muslim, however, several thousand are Christian, and they have their own king.

Most Banna are speakers of the Banna variety of the Hamar-Banna language (a member of the putative Southern branch of the Omotic languages) although it is noted that some also speak the related Aari language in and around Mokocha and Chali. It is noted that some Banna claim only slight difficulty when communicating with speakers of the Hamar and Bashada varieties of the same language, and despite their linguistic proximity there is a clear virtual border to the Banna between themselves and the neighboring Hamar in specific.

References

Further reading 

 Masuda, Ken (2000). "On the Paternity and Legitimacy of Children in an Agnatic Society: A Case from the Banna of Southern Ethiopia". Nilo-Ethiopian Studies 5-6: 25-37

Ethnic groups in Ethiopia